Colin Smith (born 30 November 1951) is an English former footballer who played as a defender in the Football League for Darlington.

Smith was born in Bishop Auckland, County Durham, and attended Bishop Auckland Grammar School. He joined Leeds United as a 15-year-old, and became an apprentice professional in 1969, but did not progress to the first team. He chose not to continue a football career, instead training as a teacher. After qualifying, he worked in special needs education, and played non-league football for clubs including Stockton, Gateshead, Bishop Auckland, West Auckland Town and Shildon, as well as winning the 1976 FA Sunday Cup with Brandon United.

In the 1984–85 season, he made five appearances for Football League club Darlington. Three were in the Associate Members' Cup and twoa 2–1 win at home to Peterborough United and a defeat by the same score away to Northampton Townwere in the Fourth Division.

Smith's wife, Dela Smith, was made a Dame Commander of the Order of the British Empire (DBE) in 2001 for services to education for children with special educational needs.

References

1951 births
Living people
Sportspeople from Bishop Auckland
Footballers from County Durham
English footballers
Association football defenders
Leeds United F.C. players
Stockton F.C. players
Gateshead F.C. players
Bishop Auckland F.C. players
West Auckland Town F.C. players
Shildon A.F.C. players
Darlington F.C. players
English Football League players